Anne Marie McEvoy (born September 19, 1975) is an American actress, psychologist, and associate professor.

Career
McEvoy's first major role was as Little Girl on the American sitcom Archie Bunker's Place, from 1982. She also guest starred and starred in many movies and television series. McEvoy is known for playing Kathy Santoni in season three of the sitcom Full House. She also appeared as Sarah in the film Children of the Corn (1984), in the television movie Lots of Luck (1985) and in the Japanese movie Piramiddo no kanata ni: White Lion densetsu (1989).

She was also the original voice of Max's sister Zoe in a pilot episode for an animated project called Space Baby (which later went onto become a full 26-episode series Fantastic Max). The role was then given to Elisabeth Harnois after the project was picked up by Hanna-Barbera and changed its title to Fantastic Max.

In 1991, McEvoy took a 25-year break from acting to focus on her personal life. She reprised her role as "Kathy Santoni" in the Full House reboot-series Fuller House.

Personal life
McEvoy received her B.A. in psychology at the University of California, Berkeley in 2000. She received her PhD in education and psychology at the University of Michigan in 2007. As of now she is an associate professor at the University of California, Irvine. In fall of 2009, she was awarded two new grants from the National Science Foundation. She is  married to James Bradford Conley. They have three children together.

Filmography

References

External links

American child actresses
American film actresses
American television actresses
Living people
University of Michigan alumni
1975 births
Place of birth missing (living people)
21st-century American women